The men's time trial H5 road cycling event at the 2020 Summer Paralympics took place on 31 August 2021, at Fuji Speedway, Tokyo. 9 riders competed in the event.

The H5 classification is for athletes who can kneel on a handcycle, a category that includes paraplegics and amputees. These riders operate a hand-operated cycle.

Results
The event took place on 31 August 2021, at 9:13:

References

Men's road time trial H5